Frank Ryan may refer to:

Frank Ryan (cricketer) (1888–1954), English cricketer
Frank Ryan (sportscaster) (1899–1961), publicity director and sports announcer
Frank Ryan (tenor) (1900–1965), Irish opera singer
Frank Ryan (Irish republican) (1902–1944), member of the Irish Republican Army and the Republican Congress
Frank Ryan (filmmaker), American screenwriter and director
Frank Ryan (Australian footballer) (1932–2011), Australian rules footballer for Richmond
Frank Ryan (mayor) (1932–2017), New Zealand politician, mayor of Mount Albert
Frank Ryan (American football) (born 1936), retired American football quarterback and mathematician
Frank Ryan (gangster) (1942–1984), Canadian mobster
Frank Ryan (politician) (born 1951), member of the Pennsylvania House of Representatives
Frank Ryan (surgeon) (1960–2010), American plastic surgeon

See also
Francis Ryan (1908–1977), U.S. soccer player
Francis T. Ryan (1862–1927), American Medal of Honor recipient
Frank P. Ryan (born 1944), British evolutionary biologist